Kane "Sugar" Johnson (born 15 March 1978) is a former Australian rules footballer and former captain of the Richmond Football Club and dual premiership winner with the Adelaide Crows in the Australian Football League (AFL).

Career
He began his career with the Adelaide Crows in 1996 and played in their 1997 and 1998 premiership sides before his 20th birthday. Over the years he developed into an outstanding midfielder and became a key member of Adelaide's onball group, but in 2001 requested that he be allowed to return to his home state of Victoria after playing out his contract the following year. The Crows management obliged, and at the end of 2002, Johnson was traded to Richmond for Jason Torney and a complicated exchange of draft picks that saw picks No. 2, No. 18 and No. 32 go from Richmond to Adelaide and picks No. 12, No. 28 and No. 41 go the other way. Whilst there, Johnson became a star player and was rewarded with the captaincy of the club in 2005. This came following Wayne Campbell's decision to step down from the position. While Johnson's 2005 season was not as good as his 2004, he still was among the Tigers' best players.

In 2006, Johnson had an outstanding season, playing as a tagger and keeping many of the game's star players in check. He won the club's best and fairest for his efforts.

Following the 2008 season, Kane Johnson stood aside as captain and was replaced by Chris Newman. He retired on 9 June 2009 after an injury believing the time was right. He remained involved as a development coach for the club for the remainder of the 2009 season.

In 2013, four years post retirement Kane now works with a variety of individuals teaching the ancient art of Qigong with modern philosophies.

Personal
In 2014, Kane Johnson had a son with long-term girlfriend Charis McKittrick.

Statistics

|-
|- style="background-color: #EAEAEA"
! scope="row" style="text-align:center" | 1996
|style="text-align:center;"|
| 28 || 2 || 0 || 0 || 3 || 3 || 6 || 1 || 0 || 0.0 || 0.0 || 1.5 || 1.5 || 3.0 || 0.5 || 0.0
|-
! scope="row" style="text-align:center;" | 1997
|style="text-align:center;"|
| 28 || 23 || 7 || 6 || 213 || 119 || 332 || 96 || 32 || 0.3 || 0.3 || 9.3 || 5.2 || 14.4 || 4.2 || 1.4
|- style="background-color: #EAEAEA"
! scope="row" style="text-align:center;" | 1998
|style="text-align:center;"|
| 28 || 12 || 2 || 6 || 95 || 63 || 158 || 31 || 15 || 0.2 || 0.5 || 7.9 || 5.3 || 13.2 || 2.6 || 1.3
|-
! scope="row" style="text-align:center" | 1999
|style="text-align:center;"|
| 28 || 15 || 6 || 3 || 145 || 102 || 247 || 51 || 12 || 0.4 || 0.2 || 9.7 || 6.8 || 16.5 || 3.4 || 0.8
|- style="background-color: #EAEAEA"
! scope="row" style="text-align:center" | 2000
|style="text-align:center;"|
| 28 || 15 || 4 || 2 || 127 || 97 || 224 || 47 || 24 || 0.3 || 0.1 || 8.5 || 6.5 || 14.9 || 3.1 || 1.6
|-
! scope="row" style="text-align:center" | 2001
|style="text-align:center;"|
| 28 || 18 || 15 || 6 || 188 || 111 || 299 || 75 || 29 || 0.8 || 0.3 || 10.4 || 6.2 || 16.6 || 4.2 || 1.6
|- style="background-color: #EAEAEA"
! scope="row" style="text-align:center" | 2002
|style="text-align:center;"|
| 28 || 19 || 10 || 9 || 250 || 193 || 443 || 77 || 30 || 0.5 || 0.5 || 13.2 || 10.2 || 23.3 || 4.1 || 1.6
|-
! scope="row" style="text-align:center" | 2003
|style="text-align:center;"|
| 28 || 20 || 10 || 10 || 283 || 154 || 437 || 88 || 58 || 0.5 || 0.5 || 14.2 || 7.7 || 21.9 || 4.4 || 2.9
|- style="background-color: #EAEAEA"
! scope="row" style="text-align:center" | 2004
|style="text-align:center;"|
| 28 || 19 || 3 || 3 || 257 || 214 || 471 || 106 || 56 || 0.2 || 0.2 || 13.5 || 11.3 || 24.8 || 5.6 || 2.9
|-
! scope="row" style="text-align:center" | 2005
|style="text-align:center;"|
| 17 || 18 || 5 || 4 || 245 || 167 || 412 || 86 || 44 || 0.3 || 0.2 || 13.6 || 9.3 || 22.9 || 4.8 || 2.4
|- style="background-color: #EAEAEA"
! scope="row" style="text-align:center" | 2006
|style="text-align:center;"|
| 17 || 19 || 5 || 2 || 202 || 126 || 328 || 104 || 47 || 0.3 || 0.1 || 10.6 || 6.6 || 17.3 || 5.5 || 2.5
|-
! scope="row" style="text-align:center" | 2007
|style="text-align:center;"|
| 17 || 22 || 4 || 3 || 243 || 197 || 440 || 126 || 70 || 0.2 || 0.1 || 11.0 || 9.0 || 20.0 || 5.7 || 3.2
|- style="background-color: #EAEAEA"
! scope="row" style="text-align:center" | 2008
|style="text-align:center;"|
| 17 || 18 || 5 || 2 || 206 || 225 || 431 || 126 || 54 || 0.3 || 0.1 || 11.4 || 12.5 || 23.9 || 7.0 || 3.0
|- class="sortbottom"
! colspan=3| Career
! 220
! 76
! 56
! 2457
! 1771
! 4228
! 1014
! 471
! 0.3
! 0.3
! 11.2
! 8.1
! 19.2
! 4.6
! 2.1
|}

References

External links
Kane Johnson profile
Kane Johnson profile from Richmond Football Club

 

Adelaide Football Club players
Adelaide Football Club Premiership players
Richmond Football Club players
Jack Dyer Medal winners
1978 births
Living people
Eastern Ranges players
Australian rules footballers from Victoria (Australia)
Two-time VFL/AFL Premiership players